Hunt Club, hunt club, or hunting club  may refer to:
 Hunt Club, area of Ottawa, Canada
Hunt Club Road
 Hunt Club Park, a different neighbourhood in Ottawa
 The Hunt Club, 2010 album by Sector Seven
 hunting club, either:
 Club (weapon) used for hunting
 Club (organization) for hunters
 :Category:Hunting with hounds lists many such clubs